Larry Bitensky (born 1966 in New York, New York) is an American composer who has written for a variety of genres, including piano, chamber ensembles, orchestra, and wind ensemble.

Biography 
Bitensky earned a DMA in composition at Cornell University and an MM in composition at Ithaca College.  His primary composition teachers include Steven Stucky, Dana Wilson, Roberto Sierra, and Karel Husa.  He also studied piano with Stephen Drury at the New England Conservatory of Music where he earned a B.M. in piano performance.

Bitensky's music has been described as "extraordinary sensitive and beautiful" and "speaking directly from the heart" and his works have been performed throughout North America and Europe. Some of his works have been also been performed by the United States Marine Band.

He is currently the Charles T. Hazelrigg Associate Professor of Music at Centre College in Danville, KY, where he teaches music theory, composition, aural skills, and world music.

Works

Chamber Works 
What Winter Dreamt
From those Beginning Notes of Yearning
Fanfare
The Other Side
Awake, You Sleepers!
One for Two
Then the Letting Go

Wind Ensemble Works 
We Tread and Go
The Closing of the Gates
Hadra
Awake, You Sleepers!
One for All
To Touch the Sky

Piano 
From the Corner Room
The Alchemy of Solitude
Scent of the World We Gave Up
Rapture
Vocalise
Shouts and Murmurs, Books 1 & 2
One for Two

Orchestra 
Awake, you Sleepers!
Einstein's Dreams
LIGHTRIDE
To Touch the Sky

Vocal 
Mishb'rey Yam
Vayashav Hamal'ach
The Drift of Things
Doctor Knickerbocker and Other Stories

References

External links 
 larrybitensky.com
 centre.edu

1966 births
Living people
Musicians from New York City
American male composers
21st-century American composers
Centre College faculty
Cornell University alumni
Ithaca College alumni
21st-century American male musicians